Aurora is a city in northwestern Portage County, Ohio, United States. A suburb in between Akron and Cleveland, the population was 17,239 at the 2020 census. It is part of the Akron metropolitan area.

Some say Aurora was the name of the daughter of Major Amos Spafford, while others believe the village was named after Aurora, the Roman goddess of dawn. The city is co-extensive with, and formed from, the former township of Aurora, which was formed from the Connecticut Western Reserve. Aurora was designated a Tree City USA by the National Arbor Day Foundation.

History 

In 1799, Ebenezer Sheldon, a former Revolutionary War soldier, settled in Aurora and built a cabin on east pioneer trail. Shortly after, he brought his family from Connecticut to live in the new settlement. In 1807 alone, 72 settlers came to Aurora, and two years later, the first frame house was built. Most people in Aurora at the time lived along the three main roads; The Cleveland-Warren road, the Chillicothe-Turnpike, and the Old Mill road. At the intersection of the three roads, inns and stores were built for settlers and travelers in Aurora. By the mid-1800s, the Chillicothe road was lined with shops, hotels, taverns, and a school. In 1862, one of the first cheese factories, the Silver Creek Cheese Factory, was built by Frank and Elisha Hurd. Ten years later, in 1872, the Aurora Station was constructed, and it became a major commercial area for the town. By the end of the 1800s, seven schools had been built, and the existing church in Aurora was also created.

In 1904, four million pounds of cheese was produced in Aurora cheese factories, making it the biggest cheese producer in the United States. One year later, Aurora's stone sidewalk was completed, stretching from Aurora Station to Town Center. In 1913, a flood destroyed the Silver Creek Factory. One of its creators, Frank Hurd, stayed in the cheese industry until 1921. The Aurora cheese industry would be on decline from then on.

In 1929, Aurora would become a village, with its first mayor being Lee Gould. Later, the remaining areas of the Aurora township would be annexed into the village. By 1970, Aurora had reached a population of almost six and a half thousand residents, and its population would grow by about two thousand in the next decade. In 1971, Aurora would become a city.

Geography 
Aurora is located at  (41.319254, -81.355859). It borders or touches the following other townships and municipalities:
 The city of Hudson, Summit County on the southwest (touches, but does not border)
 The city of Solon, Cuyahoga County on the northwest (touches, but does not border)
 Bainbridge Township, Geauga County, on the north
 Auburn Township, Geauga County, on the northeast (touches, but does not border)
 The city of Streetsboro, Portage County, on the south
 Twinsburg Township, Summit County, on the west
 The city of Reminderville, Summit County, on the west

Demographics

2010 census
As of the census of 2010, there were 15,548 people, 6,018 households, and 4,365 families residing in the city. The racial makeup of the city was 93.9% White, 1.0% African American, 0.1% Native American, 3.9% Asian, 0.2% from other races, and 1.0% from two or more races. Hispanic or Latino of any race were 1.3% of the population.

There were 6,018 households, of which 32.9% had children under the age of 18 living with them, 62.5% were married couples living together, 7.1% had a female householder with no husband present, 2.9% had a male householder with no wife present, and 27.5% were non-families. 24.0% of all households were made up of individuals, and 12.1% had someone living alone who was 65 years of age or older. The average household size was 2.54 and the average family size was 3.03.

The median age in the city was 45.4 years. 24.6% of residents were under the age of 18; 5.3% were between the ages of 18 and 24; 19.7% were from 25 to 44; 31.6% were from 45 to 64; and 19.1% were 65 years of age or older. The gender makeup of the city was 47.9% male and 52.1% female.

2000 census
As of the census of 2000, there were 13,556 people, 5,047 households, and 3,901 families residing in the city. The population density was 583.8 people per square mile (225.4/km). There were 5,361 housing units at an average density of 230.9 per square mile (89.1/km). The racial makeup of the city was 95.67% White, 1.16% African American, 0.10% Native American, 2.24% Asian, 0.01% Pacific Islander, 0.13% from other races, and 0.69% from two or more races. Hispanic or Latino of any race were 0.58% of the population.

There were 5,047 households, out of which 35.2% had children under the age of 18 living with them, 68.9% were married couples living together, 6.5% had a female householder with no husband present, and 22.7% were non-families. 19.0% of all households were made up of individuals, and 7.6% had someone living alone who was 65 years of age or older. The average household size was 2.63 and the average family size was 3.02.

In the city the population was spread out, with 25.7% under the age of 18, 4.6% from 18 to 24, 27.3% from 25 to 44, 26.9% from 45 to 64, and 15.5% who were 65 years of age or older. The median age was 41 years. For every 100 females, there were 92.9 males. For every 100 females age 18 and over, there were 88.9 males.

The median income for a household in the city was $112,547, and the median income for a family was $128,432. Males had a median income of $100,797 versus $53,846 for females. The per capita income for the city was $69,672.

Culture

Parts of central Aurora have been designated the Aurora Center Historic District. The historic district was listed on the National Register of Historic Places in 1974.

The city has several private country clubs, including Club Walden and Barrington Golf Club. In addition, it was home to the historic Aurora Golf and Country Club. In 1924, Bert Way designed the championship golf course. The course wound through 220 acres of spectacularly crafted landscape, with the Chagrin River flowing through a majority of the holes. It was constructed in natural rolling terrain, with the Aurora branch of the Chagrin River being a significant feature. In 1967, 1969, and 1970, the club hosted the Cleveland Open. Arnold Palmer once battled the course while competing in this PGA event; Arnold Palmer, along with Bruce Devlin, Charlie Coody, Gary Trivisonno, and Tom Laubacher, held the course record of 64. After 88 years, in 2012, Aurora Golf and Country Club shuttered its doors. The former course has now been converted into the Paddock River Preserve.

In 2008, the Aurora High School Greenmen, won the Division III State Championship in football. In 2016, Aurora Robotics Team TBD won the FIRST Tech Challenge FIRST Championship in St. Louis.

Various recreational facilities operated on the site of Geauga Lake continuously since before 1887. The Big Dipper roller coaster operated for 82 years at the site. The Geauga Lake amusement park permanently closed in 2007, but the Wildwater Kingdom waterpark attached to the site continued to operate until 2016. Geauga Lake historically was also the second location for the SeaWorld chain of marine mammal parks, which opened on the opposite side of the lake from the amusement park in 1970 and was home to the killer whale (orca) show known as Shamu.

Education
Aurora City School District operates three elementary schools (Leighton, Craddock, and Miller), one middle school (Harmon), and one high school, Aurora High School. In 2019, Aurora High School was ranked second in Northeast Ohio, ninth in the state, and 308th in the nation; 78% of its students participate in advanced placement. Furthermore, it boasts a 18:1 student-teacher ratio, with 986 students.

Aurora is home to Valley Christian Academy. Aurora has a public library, a branch of the Portage County District Library.

Notable people
Blanton Collier, professional football coach in the National Football League (NFL) for the Cleveland Browns
Gary Collins, professional football player in the NFL
Tom Curtis, professional football player in the NFL
Jericka Duncan, TV news correspondent
Sean Grandillo, actor
Anne Heche, actress
Fritz Heisler, professional football coach, assistant coach, and scout in the NFL for the Cleveland Browns
Chris McCarrell, actor
Ryan Norman, racing driver
Bernie Parrish, professional football player in the NFL
Dick Schafrath, professional football player in the NFL
Jim Thome, professional baseball player in Major League Baseball, lived in Aurora while playing for the Cleveland Indians

References

External links 

 Aurora Historical Society
 City website
 Aurora Chamber of Commerce website

 
Cities in Portage County, Ohio
Populated places established in 1799
Cities in Ohio